Alberto Eliani (14 January 1922 – 8 January 2009) was an Italian professional football player and manager, who played as a defender.

Club career
Eliani played for 9 seasons (216 games, 4 goals) in the Serie A for ACF Fiorentina and A.S. Roma.

International career
Eliani made his debut for the Italy national football team on 4 April 1948 against France. He also played in the match against England later that year, which Italy lost 0–4, and was never called up for the national team again.

External links
 

1922 births
2009 deaths
Italian footballers
Italy international footballers
Serie A players
ACF Fiorentina players
Modena F.C. players
A.S. Roma players
Italian football managers
Brescia Calcio managers
Udinese Calcio managers
A.S. Sambenedettese managers
Ascoli Calcio 1898 F.C. managers
Association football defenders